Boss Sounds! (subtitled Shelly Manne & His Men at Shelly's Manne-Hole) is a live album by drummer Shelly Manne recorded in 1966 and released on the Atlantic label.

Reception

The AllMusic review called it "Fine hard bop music".

Track listing
 "Margie" (Con Conrad, J. Russel Robinson, Benny Davis) - 7:31
 "Idle One" (Frank Strozier) - 7:20
 "The Breeze and I" (Ernesto Lecuona, Al Stillman) - 6:51
 "Frank's Tune" (Strozier) - 9:25
 "Wandering" (Don Specht) - 6:17
 "You Name It" (Russ Freeman) - 6:19

Personnel
Shelly Manne - drums
Conte Candoli - trumpet, flugelhorn
Frank Strozier - alto saxophone
Russ Freeman - piano
Monty Budwig - bass

References

1966 live albums
Atlantic Records live albums
Shelly Manne live albums
Albums produced by Nesuhi Ertegun
Albums recorded at Shelly's Manne-Hole